Adlerodea is a Neotropical genus of grass skippers in the family Hesperiidae.

Species
Adlerodea lemba Evans, 1955 – type locality Brazil 
Adlerodea mineira O. Mielke, 1968 – type locality Brazil 
Adlerodea modesta Hayward, 1940 – type locality Argentina

Former species
Adlerodea petrovna - transferred to Ludens petrovna (Schaus, 1902)

References
Natural History Museum Lepidoptera genus database

External links
Butterflies of the Americas images

Hesperiinae
Hesperiidae of South America
Hesperiidae genera